The 2015–16 Brisbane Roar season was the club's eighth season in the W-League. They were eliminated in the semi-finals by Melbourne City on 5–4 on penalties.

Players

Squad information

Transfers in

Transfers out

Contract extensions

Managerial staff

Squad statistics

Competitions

W-League

League table

Results summary

Results by round

Matches

Finals series

References

External links
 Official Website

Brisbane Roar FC (A-League Women) seasons
Brisbane Roar